East of Elephant Rock is a 1977 British independent drama film directed by Don Boyd and starring John Hurt, Jeremy Kemp and Judi Bowker. It was Boyd's second feature film following his little-noticed 1975 Intimate Reflections. Like William Somerset Maugham's 1927 play The Letter and two subsequent film adaptations, its narrative content depended on the 1911 Ethel Proudlock murder in Kuala Lumpur, Malaysia, which became a cause célèbre scandalising British colonial society and which had been featured in a Sunday Observer article as recently as the year before. Boyd, drawing in part on his own experience of growing up in an increasingly dysfunctional family in Kenya during the Mau Mau rebellion, wanted to tell a story about the decline of the Empire and the surrender of responsibility. In the event his project was for the most part ridiculed but the film did draw warm support from the film director Bryan Forbes.

Plot
The film is set in Ceylon in 1948. The governor is assassinated, but the colonists continue to ignore the natives' discontent with British occupation. Plantation owner Robert Proudfoot exploits his native workers, while his spoiled wife Eve (Judi Bowker) becomes progressively distant from her husband. Eventually Eve has an affair with Embassy secretary Nash (John Hurt), but soon discovers that Nash already has a mistress: a native woman. In a fit of rage, Eve murders Nash. Robert comes to Eve's rescue and tries to get her lighter sentencing for the murder.

Cast
 John Hurt ...  Nash
 Jeremy Kemp ...  Harry Rawlins
 Judi Bowker ...  Eve Proudfoot
 Christopher Cazenove ...  Robert Proudfoot
 Anton Rodgers ...  Mackintosh
 Tariq Yunus ...  Inti
 Vajira Cabraal ...  Sharmani
 Sam Poythress ...  Governor General
 Geoffrey Hale ...  Commissioner
 Upali Attanayaka ...  Rawlin's Houseboy
 J. B. L. Gunasekera ...  Sharmani's Uncle

Production
The film is treated at length in Alexander Walker's book National Heroes: British Cinema in the 70's and 80's. The script was written by Richard Boyle, with input from fellow journalist, James Atherton.
Filming took place during a four-week period in April and May 1976, on location in Sri Lanka, with a budget of just £100,000. Post production was undertaken in London and the film's score was composed by Peter Skellern.

Reception
The film was selected for the 1976 London Film Festival. The programme notes pointed out:

It took a year for Boyd to find a distributor and then secure a release, as it was an independent production - without any studio backing. Its first general screening was in January 1978, at the brand-new four-screen Classic 1-2-3-4 on Oxford Street in London.
 
The film received an extraordinarily hostile UK press and there were suggestions that Boyd had 'ripped-off' William Wyler's classic film noir The Letter. Boyd responded, not implausibly, that he simply hadn't seen Wyler's film but he certainly knew of the Proudlock affair.

Philip French, writing in The Times, commented:  while Time Out characterised it as a "depressingly redundant sample of British independent cinema".

Alexander Walker's view was more nuanced. He praises the film's often glorious mise en scène on a limited budget and especially valorises Jeremy Kemp's performance but agrees the story was ineptly handled.

Bryan Forbes came to the film's defence in a letter to The Times   later joking that his letter had cost him good reviews for his own films ever since.

The Evening Standard stated

See also
 The Long Day Wanes: A Malayan Trilogy. Anthony Burgess' definitive fictional exploration of post-war colonial life in Malaya during the Malayan Emergency.

References

1977 films
1970s historical films
British historical films
1970s English-language films
British independent films
Films shot in Sri Lanka
Films directed by Don Boyd
Films set in the British Empire
1977 independent films
1970s British films